Faramarz is an Iranian legendary hero (pahlavan) in Ferdowsi's Shahnameh ("Book of Kings"). He was son of Rostam and at last killed by Kay Bahman.

The book Faramarz-nama, written about a hundred years after Shahnameh, is about Faramarz and his wars. Also he is mentioned in other ancient books like Borzu Nama.

See also
 Shahnameh
 Faramarz nama

References

Persian mythology
Shahnameh characters
Given names